Ronald H. Turner (born 1911, date of death unknown) was a Rhodesian international lawn bowler.

He won three bronze medals in the fours competition at consecutive Commonwealth Games. They came in the 1954 British Empire and Commonwealth Games in Vancouver, 1958 British Empire and Commonwealth Games in Cardiff and the 1962 British Empire and Commonwealth Games in Perth.

References

1911 births
Year of death missing
Sportspeople from Cape Town
South African emigrants to Rhodesia
South African male bowls players
Zimbabwean male bowls players
Commonwealth Games bronze medallists for Southern Rhodesia
Commonwealth Games bronze medallists for Rhodesia and Nyasaland
Bowls players at the 1954 British Empire and Commonwealth Games
Bowls players at the 1958 British Empire and Commonwealth Games
Bowls players at the 1962 British Empire and Commonwealth Games
Commonwealth Games medallists in lawn bowls
Medallists at the 1954 British Empire and Commonwealth Games
Medallists at the 1958 British Empire and Commonwealth Games
Medallists at the 1962 British Empire and Commonwealth Games